Categorical set theory is any one of several versions of set theory developed from or treated in the context of mathematical category theory.

See also

 Categorical logic

References

External links

Category theory
Set theory
Formal methods
Categorical logic